CBS 11 may refer to one of the following television stations in the United States:

Currently affiliated
KCBY-TV in Coos Bay, Oregon
Re-broadcast of KVAL-TV in Eugene, Oregon
KELO-TV in Sioux Falls, South Dakota
KGIN in Grand Island, Nebraska
Re-broadcast of KOLN in Lincoln, Nebraska
KHOU in Houston, Texas
KKTV in Colorado Springs, Colorado
KMVT in Twin Falls, Idaho
KTVT in Dallas/Fort Worth, Texas (O&O)
KUAM-DT2 in Hagåtña, Guam (cable channel; broadcasts on channel 8.2)
KVLY-DT2 in Fargo, North Dakota
KXMD-TV in Williston, North Dakota
Part of the KX Television Network
WBKB-TV in Alpena, Michigan
WINK-TV in Fort Myers, Florida
WJHL-TV in Johnson City, Tennessee
WTOC-TV in Savannah, Georgia
WTOL in Toledo, Ohio

Formerly affiliated
KSTW in Seattle/Tacoma, Washington (1953 to 1958, 1960 to 1962 and 1995 to 1997; now a CW owned-and-operated station)
KTTV in Los Angeles, California (1949 to 1951; now a Fox owned-and-operated station)
KTVA in Anchorage, Alaska (1953 to 2020)
KTVF in Fairbanks, Alaska (1955 to 1996)
KUAM-LP in Hagåtña, Guam (cable channel; was on channel 20 from 1995 to 2013)
WBAL-TV in Baltimore, Maryland (1981 to 1995)
WHAS-TV in Louisville, Kentucky (1950 to 1990)
WTVD in Raleigh/Durham, North Carolina (1957 to 1985; now an ABC owned-and-operated station)